"Imno ning Kapampangan" (alternatively spelled "Himno ning Kapampangan"; Kapampangan for "Hymn of Pampanga"), also known as the Pampanga Hymn, is the official anthem of the province of Pampanga in the Philippines.

History
A provincial hymn for Pampanga was commissioned by Governor Estelito Mendoza, in connection with the signing of Proclamation No. 2226 by President Ferdinand Marcos, which officially made the Aldo ning Kapampangan (Pampanga Day), the province's foundation day, a non-working holiday.

The lyrics to "Imno ning Kapampangan" were commissioned by Mendoza in early 1982. With Aristedes “Teddy” Panopio, brother of noted Kapampangan yodeler Fred Panopio, serving as his emissary, Mendoza initially commissioned Jose Gallardo and Vedasto Ocampo for the project. Gallardo was a noted poet who held the honorary title of "Ari ning Parnaso" ("King of Parnassus"), bestowed upon the province's premier poet, while Ocampo was the organizer of the Ligligan Pamanyulat Kapampangan, a province-sponsored Kapampangan-language writing contest. Ocampo later suggested to Panopio that they should invite another noted Kapampangan poet, Serafin Lacson, to join them.

All three poets initially decided to write separate poems, which they would then compare to one another. After their first writing session, which took thirty minutes, the poems were found to be substantially similar to one another with only minor differences in meter and rhyme, which led to Lacson and Ocampo asking Gallardo to consolidate all three into one composition. The final lyrics, building largely on Gallardo's version, was completed after three days, after which copies were circulated between Ocampo, Lacson and a few others. At the request of two Carmelite nuns, Ocampo also translated the lyrics into English for non-Kapampangan speakers.

After the lyrics were finalized, the provincial government organized a songwriting competition for the hymn's melody, which was won by Monsignor Gregorio Canlas, known in Pampanga for his church hymns. Canlas also arranged the composition, which was primarily played by a government brass band.

While "Imno ning Kapampangan" was finished in 1982, and the song's ownership passed to the provincial government, it did not become the official song of Pampanga until April 14, 1988, when the Sangguniang Panlalawigan of Pampanga, led by Vice Governor Cielo Macapagal Salgado, passed Resolution No. 18 which institutionalized the song's legal status.

Lyrics
For several years, the lyrics to "Imno ning Kapampangan" was believed to only have one author: Serafin Lacson. This changed though starting in 2010, when researcher Joel Mallari wrote to the Pampanga edition of the SunStar, validating rumored claims of the song having multiple authors. Three years later, further research uncovered documents which proved the song's multiple authorship, as well as Vedasto Ocampo's preference that the authors remain anonymous.

The lyrics of the song, which was deliberately written with allegorical language and a limit of 12 lines, have been interpreted as being a strong statement of Kapampangans' love for their province, with the music evoking a sense of pride.

Performance
Singing "Imno ning Kapampangan" is mandatory whenever there is an official event being held in the province of Pampanga. In addition to its performance at official functions, the song has since been included in anthologies of Kapampangan traditional music, released by various Kapampangan musical artists.

References

External links

Regional songs
National anthem compositions in C major
Culture of Pampanga
Philippine anthems
Asian anthems
1982 compositions